St. Stephen Lutheran Church can mean 2 things 

St. Stephen Lutheran Church (Urbandale, Iowa)
Saint Stephen Evangelical Lutheran Church of Milwaukee